Markus Dieckmann (born 7 January 1976 in Bonn) is a retired professional beach volleyball player from Germany, who represented his native country at the 2004 Summer Olympics in Athens, Greece. There he ended up in ninth place in the overall-rankings.

Partnering Jonas Reckermann he twice won the gold medal at the European Beach Volleyball Championships, in 2002 and 2004. His twin brother Christoph Dieckmann also played as a professional beach volleyball player on the international tour.

Playing partners
 Christoph Dieckmann
 Jonas Reckermann
 Julius Brink
 Erik Schmidt
 Drazan Slacanin

References
 Markus Dieckmann at the Beach Volleyball Database

1976 births
Living people
German men's beach volleyball players
Beach volleyball players at the 2004 Summer Olympics
Olympic beach volleyball players of Germany
Sportspeople from Bonn
Twin sportspeople
German twins